Alan Black (born 1 May 1957) is an Australian former professional basketball player and coach. He is most notable for coaching both the Perth Wildcats and the Cairns Taipans in the Australian National Basketball League.

Black has three children, sons Stephen (former NBL player) and Andrew, and daughter Marissa.

Playing career
Black started his NBL playing career in the league's inaugural year, 1979, playing for the Nunawading Spectres.  In 1981, he was a member of the Nunawading side that lost to Launcestion Casino City in the Grand Final that season.  After seven seasons with the Spectres, Black made the move west in 1986 to play for the Perth Wildcats.  In 1987, Black was once again a member of a losing Grand Final side when the Wildcats were defeated by the Brisbane Bullets. After only one more season with the Wildcats, Black retired from playing in 1988.

Coaching career
Black started his NBL coaching career by replacing then Wildcats head coach Cal Bruton in 1989.  His rookie coaching season saw him lead the Wildcats to third on the NBL ladder (with 16 wins and 8 losses) and through to the semi-finals.  In 1990 he was once again named the Wildcats head coach, but after only two games was controversially fired by the club to be replaced by Cal Bruton for the remainder of the season.  That season saw the Wildcats win their very first championship with the team Black had recruited.

In 1993, Black became the head coach for the Illawarra Hawks and led the club into the quarter finals each  year until he left the club at the end of the 1995 season.  During his time with the Hawks, Black was named the NBL's Coach of the Year in both 1993 and 1995.

Black move to Sydney in 1996 to begin coaching the Sydney Kings.  However, his tenure with the Kings was not as successful as his time with the Hawks and left the club after the 1997 season.

In 1998, Black returned to the Perth Wildcats as head coach, this time replacing Adrian Hurley.  The following season Black's son, Stephen, began his NBL career with the Wildcats, appearing in a minor role to replace the injured Ricky Grace. He would eventually become a full member of the squad in 1999.

This time around, Alan Black's tenure at the Wildcats lasted considerably longer than his first, and also resulted in his first NBL championship in 1999/2000.  Black coached the Wildcats for six straight seasons before history seemed to repeat itself.  After being defeated by the Sydney Kings in the 2002/2003 grand final series, Black was once again fired by the club which was somewhat surprising, especially to the coach that had led them to their 7th grand final appearance.  Black was replaced by his assistant coach Mike Ellis.  In response to his fathers sacking, son Stephen also departed the club.

Black returned to the NBL as a head coach in 2005, this time for the Cairns Taipans. In his first season with the Taipans, he coached the team to their highest finish on the NBL ladder (5th) and to their first semi-final appearance. After the club went into receivership at the end of 2008, Black agreed to a pay reduction of 50% to continue to aid the floundering NBL club. Despite this he was still sacked from the team just prior to the end of the season.

In 2015, Black was appointed head coach of the Willetton Tigers for the 2015 MSBL season, joining his son Andrew, a player at the club. Midway through the 2016 season, Black resigned from the role to take up a consulting position in Malaysia.

Olympic career
During the 1990s and the early 2000s, Black served as an assistant coach for the Australian Boomers, including during the 1996 Atlanta Olympics, the 1998 FIBA World Championship and the 2000 Sydney Olympics.

References

External links
 Euroabsket.com profile

1957 births
Living people
Australian men's basketball coaches
Australian men's basketball players
Perth Wildcats players
Cairns Taipans coaches
Perth Wildcats coaches